Corey James Anderson (born 13 December 1990) is a former New Zealand cricketer who has played as an all-rounder for New Zealand in international cricket, as well as Royal Challengers Bangalore, Mumbai Indians in the IPL and Northern Districts in New Zealand first class cricket. After retiring from the New Zealand team in 2020, he announced his intention to play for the USA Cricket Team in 2022.

On 1 January 2014, Anderson shot to fame by scoring the then fastest century in the history of One Day International cricket. Playing against West Indies, he reached his hundred in just 36 balls, breaking Shahid Afridi's previous record of 37 deliveries. Anderson finished the innings unbeaten on 131 in 47 balls, hitting 14 sixes and 6 fours. This record was later broken in 2015 by AB de Villiers, who scored a century against the West Indies from just 31 deliveries.

Domestic career

Anderson came into the Canterbury Wizards Squad in the 2006/07 season freshly promoted from his performances for the New Zealand under-19 cricket team. He also played for his high school 1st XI team at Christchurch Boys' High School including playing in the side which won three consecutive Gillette Cups from 2005 to 2007.

Anderson was also jointly named player of the Gillette cup in 2006 when he shared this honor with current Blackcap Tim Southee.

In 2007, Anderson received a playing contract from New Zealand Cricket, making him the youngest player in New Zealand first-class cricket history to gain a contract.

Anderson had yet to show his full potential at first class level and after several injuries interrupted seasons with shoulder and groin injuries, Corey Anderson transferred to Northern Districts at the start of the 2011/12 season to restart his promising career.

International career

ODI career
Anderson made his debut for New Zealand in a T20 international against South Africa on 21 December 2012 after being named in the T20I and ODI squad for the  2012–13
tour of South Africa. He was included in New Zealand's ODI squad for the Champions Trophy in 2013, and made his ODI debut against England in Cardiff on 16 June 2013.
 
On 1 January 2014, at the Queenstown Events Centre Anderson broke Shahid Afridi's 17-year-old record of the fastest ODI hundred by one ball, scoring his in 36 balls. He eventually ended with an unbeaten 131 that featured 14 sixes and 6 fours. Along with Jesse Ryder, he helped New Zealand set the team record for the most sixes in an ODI innings. On 18 January 2015, his record was broken by AB de Villiers scoring the hundred in 31 balls vs West Indies.

Test career
Anderson made his Test debut against Bangladesh on 9 July 2013 and scored 1 & 8 with the bat. He obtained two wickets from 19 overs with the ball.
Anderson hit his maiden Test century in his second Test match. He scored 116 runs from 173 balls and took one wicket.

In May 2018, he was one of twenty players to be awarded a new contract for the 2018–19 season by New Zealand Cricket.

T20 career

Indian Premier League
Anderson played in the IPL 7 for the Mumbai Indians who paid him 45 million rupees (US$750,000). In his debut match against Kolkata Knight Riders, he scored only 2 runs before being bowled by Sunil Narine. He bowled 3 overs and conceded 33 runs for no wickets.

Anderson obtained his first Man of the Match award against Kings XI Punjab on 3 May 2014, where he picked up the wicket of Cheteshwar Pujara and scored 35 runs from 25 balls.

On 25 May 2014, against the Rajasthan Royals, Anderson led his team, the Mumbai Indians through to the play-offs by scoring an unbeaten 95 off just 44 balls with Mumbai chasing the total of 190 in only 14.3 overs in order to qualify for playoffs with a better net run rate.

In IPL 8, Anderson made valuable contributions with his bat in the earlier games, scoring two half centuries in four games, but was ruled out following a finger injury.

In February 2017, he was bought by the Delhi Daredevils team for the 2017 Indian Premier League for 1 crore. He would replace fast bowler Nathan Coulter-Nile in the Royal Challengers Bangalore squad for the  2018 IPL season, the IPL Technical Committee confirmed on March 24. Coulter-Nile, who played a key role in Kolkata Knight Riders' season last year with 15 wickets from eight games, was ruled out owing to an injury and was prescribed 'ample rest'.

Other leagues
Anderson was scheduled to play for Kathmandu Kings XI in the Nepal's topmost franchise T20 league, the Everest Premier League 2020. However, the following month the tournament was cancelled due to COVID-19.

After being hampered by injuries over the last several years, Anderson announced his retirement from New Zealand Cricket in December 2020, and his subsequent signing of a three-year contract with the US-based Major League Cricket T20 competition. This decision was made with an eye towards eventually representing the US in international competition, as his fiancée is American. In June 2021, Anderson was selected in the players' draft ahead of the Minor League Cricket tournament.

References

External links
 

1990 births
Auckland cricketers
Barbados Royals cricketers
Canterbury cricketers
Cricketers at the 2015 Cricket World Cup
Cricketers from Christchurch
Delhi Capitals cricketers
Lahore Qalandars cricketers
Living people
Mumbai Indians cricketers
New Zealand cricketers
New Zealand One Day International cricketers
New Zealand Test cricketers
New Zealand Twenty20 International cricketers
Northern Districts cricketers
People educated at Christchurch Boys' High School
Royal Challengers Bangalore cricketers
Somerset cricketers